A list of British films released in 1996.

1996

See also
 1996 in film
 1996 in British music
 1996 in British radio
 1996 in British television
 1996 in the United Kingdom
 List of 1996 box office number-one films in the United Kingdom

External links

1996
Films
Lists of 1996 films by country or language